William Alexander Hoke (1851–1925) was a North Carolina politician and jurist who served as an associate justice (1905–1924) and chief justice (1924–1925) of the North Carolina Supreme Court.

Born in Lincolnton, North Carolina, Hoke's father was a cousin of General Robert Hoke. He studied law under Chief Justice Richmond Mumford Pearson at Richmond Hill Law School. A Democrat, "Alex" Hoke, as he was known, represented Lincoln County in the North Carolina House of Representatives in 1889 and was elected a state Superior Court judge the following year. He was elected to the state Supreme Court in 1904 as an associate justice. Re-elected in 1912 and 1920, Hoke was appointed chief justice on June 2, 1924 by Governor Cameron Morrison, upon the death of Walter Clark. Although he was elected chief justice in November 1924, Hoke resigned in March 1925 due to failing health. He died on September 13, 1925 and is buried in St. Luke's Episcopal Church Cemetery in Lincolnton, North Carolina.

A friend of Zebulon B. Vance, Hoke chaired the commission to provide a statue of Vance for Statuary Hall in the United States Capitol.

References
North Carolina Historical Marker
Inventory of the William Alexander Hoke Papers
The Political Graveyard

1851 births
1925 deaths
Democratic Party members of the North Carolina House of Representatives
People from Lincolnton, North Carolina
Chief Justices of the North Carolina Supreme Court